Samuel Crockett may refer to:

 S. R. Crockett (Samuel Rutherford Crockett, 1860–1914), Scottish novelist
 Samuel Crockett (Wisconsin politician) (1821–1900), American politician in Wisconsin
 Samuel T. Crockett (1890–1946), member of the Virginia Senate